The wildlife of South Korea comprises many animals, fungi and plants. Wildlife refers to animal and plant species that live in the wild or natural state such as mountains or rivers. According to the South Korean Ministry of Environment, the rich diversity of South Korea's wildlife includes 8,271 species of plants, 18,117 species of animals and 3,528 species of others. 30,000 species are known to exist in South Korea, but it is expected that there are more than 100,000 species.

Animalia

South Korea is surrounded by water on three sides. The southern sea (South Sea (Korea)) and the western sea of South Korea (Yellow Sea) have irregular coastlines. South Korea runs from north to south and it has complex terrain. Therefore, South Korea has various climate zones and high precipitation, and this condition leads to a diversity of wildlife.

In South Korea, there are 18,117 species of animals. It contains 1,528 species of vertebrate, 13,025 species of insect and 3,564 species of other invertebrates.

Endangered wildlife
Article 2 of the Wildlife Conservation and Management Act discusses endangered wild animals in South Korea. There are 246 endangered animals in South Korea, with numerous species in need of urgent conservation measures. Endangered wild animals in South Korea include:
Leopard cat is the country's only wild cat. It lives foremost in mountainous regions.
Red-crowned crane occurs along Imjin River.
Golden eagle ranges across the country.
Siberian musk deer occurs at Mokpo in South Jeolla Province.
Hodgson's bat
Asian black bear
Mongolian wolf occurs in North Gyeongsang Province, Gangwon Province and North Chungcheong Province.

Harmful wild animals
Harmful wild animals are wild animals which damage property or endanger people.

For example, harmful wild animals in South Korea include
Sparrow, magpie, jay, crow, brown-eared bulbul which damage fruit crops in groups over a long period of time.
Pigeon, pheasant, elk, mole, red squirrel, some kinds of rat and duck which have high population densities, and therefore damage agriculture, forests and fisheries.
Magpie which damage power facilities such as utility poles.
Pigeon which damage residence with pigeon's feces or feathers.
Wild boar roam the mountain sides, but have been coming down to the city centers in search of food. These animals are big, strong, and fast and can potentially be fatal to humans.
Asian giant hornet when they are grouped together they are ruthless insects that can destroy an entire hive of bumble bees. they usually live in large trees and they have been known to attack humans that accidentally run into their nest.

Flora
In South Korea, there are 8,271 species of plants. It contains 4,662 species of higher plants and 3,609 species of lower plants. Wild plants in South Korea include Korean native species such as Pentactina. Despite the biodiversity, ecosystems in South Korea are unstable because of land development. 67 km2 of forest disappear each year. This means that 0.1% of total South Korean forests are disappearing each year.

Distribution of plants
Korea can be divided largely into three biozones by distribution of plants. The groups are warm-temperate forest, temperate forest and subalpine forest. Considering regional character of Ulleungdo and Jejudo, Korea can divide into five regions. Evergreen broad-leaved trees grow in warm-temperate forest. Warm-temperate forest in Korea includes the southern coastal region, Jeju Island and several islands of the southern sea which are under 35°N. Some of the species here include Quercus myrsinaefolia, Quercus acuta, Quercus salicina, Daphniphyllum macropodum, Castanopsis cuspidata, Ligustrum foliosum nakai, Machilus thunbergii. South Korea is dominated by temperate forest which takes 85% of its territory. Land between Korean Demilitarized Zone and the northern part of 35°N belongs to this. Common  species in temperate forest are Carpinus laxiflora, Carpinus tschonoskii Maxim, Quercus mongolica. A subalpine forest exists in the Kaema Plateau in North Korea or south-central's higher mountains. Picea jezoensis, Pinus pumila, Abies nephrolepis, Larix gmelinii and Abies holophylla can be found there.

Warm-temperate forest
Ulleungdo : A sort of trees which reseed with Mt. Seonginbong as a center based on approximately 600 m altitude. Altitudes below 600 m have wild plants in the Southern province that are magnolia, Euonymus japonicus, Camellia japonica, Hedera rhombea, Ardisia japonica, Vitex rotundifolia and others. An altitude of 600 m or above has Fagus crenata and Sorbus commixta.
Jejudo can be divided into coast vegetation and mountain vegetation. Coast vegetation consists of Sinomenium acutum, Machilus thunbergii, Daphniphyllum macropodum, Camellia japonica, Vitex rotundifolia, Centella asiatica. Reynoutria elliptica, Hydrangea serrata, Eleutherococcus senticosus, Aconitum napiforme, Schisandra repanda and others.

Temperate forest
The southern part of temperate forest is contained in a region  37°N at the west coast, 38°N at the east coast and inner land's temperate forest that is a southern part of 36.5°. There are common bamboo, Acer palmatum, Carpinus laxiflora and others. In Jirisan mountain, there are Hemerocallis fulva, Picea jezoensis, Cornus officinalis, Rhododendron mucronulatum, Abies koreana, Eleutherococcus senticosus, Aconitum chiisanense, Angelica gigas and others. In Mt. Deogyusan, there are Aconitum uchiyamai, Sorbus commixta, Acanthopanax sessiliflorus, Cimicifuga simplex and others. In the coast district, there are Camellia japonica, Euonymus japonicus, Daphniphyllum macropodum, Camellia sinensis and others.

The central part of temperate forest contains 39°N at the west coast, 40°N at the east coast and inner land's temperate forest that include between a southern part of 38° boundary line (38th parallel north) and Northern Limit Line of south temperate forest. There are Quercus dentatomongolica, Acer pictum subsp. mono, Betula costata, Zanthoxylum planispinum and others. In Seoraksan Mountain, there are Hemerocallis dumortieri, Ampelopsis brevipedunculata, Rhododendron brachycarpum, Rhododendron fauriae and others. In Odaesan Mountain, there are Astilbe chinensis, Berberis koreana, lily of the valley and others. In Chiaksan Mountain, there are Codonopsis lanceolata, Lactuca indica, Hieracium umbellatum, Aconitum and others. In Mt.Taebaeksan, there are Juniperus chinensis, Taxus cuspidata, Juniperus rigida, Pinus densiflora, Viola diamantica Nakai, Trientalis europaea, Arisaema erubescens and others. In Cheonmasan Mountain, there are Juniperus chinensis, Taxus cuspidata, Juniperus rigida, Draba nemorosa L., Eranthis stellata Maxim, Hepatica asiatica Nakai, Adonis amurensis, Heloniopsis koreana and others. In Mt.Sobaeksan, there are Iris rossii, Hylomecon and others. In Woraksan Mountain, there are Actinidia arguta, Thymus quinquecostatus, Rubus coreanus and others. In Mt.Songnisan, there are Leonurus japonicus, Angelica gigas and others. In Juwangsan mountain, there are Staphylea pinnata, Jeffersonia, Fraxinus rhynchophylla, Rhododendron schlippenbachii and others. In the islands of the west coast, there are Machilus thunbergii, Camellia japonica, Epimedium koreanum, Scopolia japonica, Berberis koreana, Valeriana fauriei, Cornus officinalis, Schisandra chinensis and others.

The northern part of the temperate forest is in between a north limit of central temperate forest and boundary line(38th parallel north). There are Betula platyphylla, Pinus koraiensis, Acer komarovii, Ligularia fischeri, Rhododendron aureum, Epimedium koreanum, rhubarb, Viola mandshurica, Lithospermum erythrorhizon and others.

Subalpine forest
In South Korea, boreal forest doesn't exist in the lowlands. However, subalpine coniferous forest is found in highland or mountainous district in South Korea. Part of Hallasan, part of Seoraksan, fir forest of Jirisan and Gotjawal Forest in Jejudo are the subalpine forests in South Korea. At an altitude of 1200 m–1500 m in Hallasan Mountain, there is a coniferous forest which consists of pine, juniper, a Korean fir. Fruticeta is formed in 1500 m–1700 m and the alpine zone spread out above 1850 m. South-facing slopes have more mild weather than north-facing slopes. Therefore, its height extends a little more on the south side.

Endangered wild plants
Endangered wild plants are divided into first grade and second grade.

First grade endangered wild plants refers to species of plant in which the number is significantly reduced by natural causes or artificial factors. The species are selected by the minister of environment after a prior consultation with the minister of central administration organization. First grade endangered wild plants refer to the following species:
Malus komarovii (이노리나무): This plant is found in Korea and in China. The height is 5m. It grows deep in the mountain.
Cypripedium japonicum ((광릉요강꽃(광릉복주머니란) 난초과)) : It can found in Namyangju, Gyeonggi Province. Its height is 20 cm~40 cm and it blossoms in April to May.
Aerides japonicum Reichb. fil (나도풍란 난초과) : It can found in Jeju Province or South Jeolla Province, which is the warmest region in South Korea. It has an aerial root. The length of the leaves is 8 cm~15 cm.
Euchresta japonica Hook. f. (만년콩 콩과) : It grows in forests of valleys in Jeju Province. Its size is about 30 cm~80 cm. It blossoms in July and its color is white.
Diapensia lapponica L. (암매(돌매화나무) 암매과) : It is found in Mt. Hallasan in Jeju Province. It blossoms in June to July and its color is white or pink.
Cymbidium lancifolium (죽백란 난초과) : It can be found in Mt. Hallasan in Jeju Province. Its height is about 10 cm~20 cm. It blossoms in May to July. This plant thrives in strong sunlight and its flowers are beautiful. Thus this plant has great value as an ornamental plant.
Neofinetia falcata (풍란 난초과) : It is found in the southern island in South Korea and Japan. Its height is about 3~15 cm.
Cymbidium kanran (한란 난초과) : It grows in the southern Jeju Province and its size is about 25~60 cm.

Second grade endangered wild plants are species of plant in which the number is significantly reduced by natural causes or artificial factors. These plants have the possibility of becoming extinct in the foreseeable future. The species are selected by the Minister of Environment:
Euryale ferox (가시연꽃 수련과) : It can be found in Gyeonggi Province and Gangwon Province, but water pollution has caused a crisis of extinction. It grows in ponds or swamps.
Siberian ginseng (가시오갈피나무 두릅나무과) : It is found in Gyeonggi, Gangwon, and North Gyeongsang Province. It grows in high mountain forests. It comes into blossom in June to July and ripens in September to October.
Jeffersonia (깽깽이풀 매자나무과) : It is an ornamental plant, but its root is used inr herbal medicine.
Sundew (끈끈이귀개) : It is an insectivorous plant and it grows on beaches in the South Jeolla Province.
Rhododendron aureum (노랑만병초) : It grows in alpine region. Its height is near 1m. It blossoms in May to June and its leaf is used in herbal medicine.
Iris odaesanensis Y. N. Lee (노랑무늬붓꽃) : An endemic species in Koreak, it grows in the South Gyeongsang Province mountains such as Odaesan, Taebaeksan. It is usually used as an ornamental plant and its fresh sprouts are used for food.
Aster altaicus var. uchiyamae (단양쑥부쟁이) : It grows on sandy soil near streams. It blossoms in August to September and its flower color is purple inclining to red. It is a special plant in South Korea and it can be found in Yeoju, Gyeonggi Province, and Danyang County, North Chungcheong Province.
Ranunculus kazusensis (매화마름) : It grows in a ditch (waterway) around a paddy field. Its distribution is in the southern province and west coast. It blossoms in April or May. Its flower grows to 30 ~ 50 cm and it bears fruit in June or July.
Isoetes (물부추) : It grows in shallow water. It was found in Pyeongtaek in 1942; however, it died out in Korea and currently grows in Japan. It grows to 10 ~ 30 cm. The plant is dark green and resembles eggs.
Vexillabium yakushimense (Yamamoto) F. Maekawa (백운란) : Its size is 4 ~ 10 cm. It grows in mountains and forests in South Jeolla Province and North Jeolla Province. It flowers in August with one to three white blossoms.
Saururus chinensis (삼백초) : It flowers in June to August. It grows to 50 ~ 100 cm. It grows in the valley that is well ventilated and penumbra, and air humidity is high in Jejudo and Mt.Jirisan.
Viola raddeana Regel (선제비꽃) : It is a perennial plant that grows rare in a brook in South Gyeongsang Province and Gyeonggi Province. Its height is 30 ~ 50 cm.
Lilium cernuum Kom (솔나리) : It grows in mountainous regions. Its stem is thin and strong and it grows to 70 cm. It flowers in July or August.
Psilotum nudum (솔잎란) : It grows on the coast in the southern part of Jejudo. It grows to a height of 10~30 cm. Its root is short and 1 ~ 3mm in diameter.
Wisteriopsis japonica (Sieb. et Zucc.) A. Gray (syn. Millettia japonica) (애기등) : Its stem is thin and fragile and the stem's height is roughly 3m. Its scions have fur. It flowers white in July or August. It bears fruit in October. It grows in South Jeolla Province and South Gyeongsang Province.
Viola websteri Hemsl (왕제비꽃) : It grows in areas that have a lot of moisture. It flowers white in April or May. It grows to 40 ~ 90 cm. It is found in Gapyeong County in Gyeonggi, Sambang County in South Hamgyong Province (North Korea), and Paektu Mountain (North Korea). It is a Korean endemic species.
Cyrtosia septentrionalis (으름난초) : Called 'Gaecheon-ma', it grows in forests in Jejudo. Its height is 50 ~ 100 cm. It is a parasitic plant. Its root contains hyphae of Armillaria (a mushroom). It flowers brown in June or July.
Polygonatum stenophyllum Maxim (층층둥굴레) : It grows in mountains and pastures. It grows to 30 ~ 90 cm. Its rhizome is thick and grows sideways. It blooms in June with a soft yellow flower.
Mankyua chejuense (제주고사리삼) : An endemic species of Jejudo, it is the only plant that was identified of its habitat. It was discovered in 2001. It preserves the primitive shape of bracken.  It is called 'Mankyua chejuense'. Its height is 10 ~ 15 cm.
Leontice microrhyncha S. Moore (한계령풀) : It grows to 30 ~ 40 cm. It is found in penumbra or fertile region in high mountain. It has three leaves. It flowers in July and August. It is used as an ornamental plant.

Wildlife in the Demilitarized Zone (DMZ) 
The Demilitarized Zone (DMZ) Is the unmanned strip of land that exists between North Korea and South Korea. The DMZ has been a representation of the two nation's tension for over 50 years and it is a contributing factor of the events that led to The Korean War in 1950. During the Armistice between the two nations the ecosystem of the area has reverted to its natural state due to the lack of human interference; The DMZ and Civilian Control Zone (CCZ) in South Korea encompass many rivers and an abundant amount of diverse ecosystems along with substantial amounts of plant, mammal, fish and bird species, many of which are globally endangered.

Over 5,000 species of plants and animals have been identified as living in The DMZ, including a significant amount which are considered protected on the endangered species list. These endangered species living in The DMZ include: Siberian musk deer, white-naped crane, red-crowned crane, Asiatic black bear, cinereous vulture and the long-tailed goral.

Preserving Biodiversity in the DMZ 

 The DMZ  and the CCZ are bordered by land mines which leaves the areas in-between untouched by humans. This untouched habitat is significant for persevering the East Asia flyway system of migratory birds from Russia to Australia. The white-naped crane, and the red-crowned crane populations are the two being affected.
 This area is also considered home to many other endangered species of birds and mammals alike, including the Asiatic black bear. The Asiatic black bear is considered; threatened, on the endangered species list due to people harvesting the stomach bile and gallbladders from the bears and using it for Chinese medicinal purposes.
 The importance of wildlife conservation and undisturbed habitats are the objectives of many, including the South Korean Ministry of Environment. who wish to keep the DMZ untouched by people, in order to safeguard the existing biodiversity.

Controversies
The Han river ecosystem is endangered because the water flow changed due to water blocking construction at Ilsan Bridge. Deposition of materials in the river caused environmental damage. The Korean Association for the Protection of Wild Birds claimed to remove the structure, which possibly destroyed the natural ecology and caused the bank to overflow.

In the media
The Nakdong River Basin Environmental Office set up an unmanned camera and successfully captured images of the wildlife. In the video, wild animals are seen moving around the alpine wetland and displayed various actions such as hunting and marking their territories. Martens that were observed at this time were selected as endangered animals and they were apex predator in South Korea. The video has great importance to scientific research as it is the first to document the wildlife in real time. In addition, it offers scientists and government officials the opportunity to reconsider the preservation of the alpine climate.

See also
Wildlife of Korea

References

External links
Korea Association of Wild Animals Protection
Korean Association of Wild Birds Protection
Korea Biodiversity Information System
Portal of living resource in South Korea

Environment of South Korea
South Korea